Ratan Dewasi Desai (born 25 September 1975) is an Indian politician. He is a member of All India Congress Committee and state spokesperson of Rajasthan State Congress. 
, He has been an MLA from Raniwara constituency in the Rajasthan Assembly elections, 2008  and Deputy Chief Whip (Minister of State) in the Ashok Gehlot government.

He was elected MLA from Raniwara constituency in the 2008 assembly elections and since 2011 has been the government deputy chief whip in the then Ashok Gehlot government.
At present, he is a popular, active and powerful leader of the Congress party in Jalore and Sirohi districts of western Rajasthan.

Personal, early life and background

Ratan Dewasi was born on 25 September 1975 in Mount Abu, Sirohi district of Rajasthan. His father's name is Shankarlal Dewasi and his wife's name is Viraj Dewasi. Dewasi has been a bright Student since Childhood. He is a diploma in hotel management degree holder. The resident student is sharp and hard spoken since his life.

Politics started from student life 
Ratan Dewasi first started politics as a student leader by joining the student political organization National Student Union of India (a unit of the Congress Party).

Legislative Assembly election

Rajasthan Legislative Assembly election 2003 

The result of Rajasthan Legislative Assembly election, 2003 was declared on 6 December, in which the BJP defeated the ruling party Congress. In the election of the Congress party had fielded Ratan Dewasi in place of Ratana Ram Chaudhary, a strong farmer leader and four-time MLA from Raniwara region. The first assembly election was for Ratan Dewasi, a new candidate from the Congress. And Arjun Singh Deora from BJP was in front of him. In the first election, Ratan Dewasi had to face defeat and Arjun Singh Deora again became MLA. In this election, Deora got 50445 votes and Dewasi got 38650 votes.

Rajasthan Legislative Assembly election 2008 

The assembly elections of 2008, in front of Congress candidate Ratan Dewasi, new candidate from BJP Narayan Singh Dewal and Independent Candidate Arjun Singh Deora were in the election. After cutting the ticket of Arjun Singh Deora, a 3-time MLA from Raniwara region and a minister in the BJP government, the BJP made Dewal a candidate, due to which, Deora rebelled and made the election in an independent ground very exciting. In this election, Dewasi got 46716 and Narayan Singh Dewal got 26914 votes. In this triangular election, Ratan Dewasi registered a historic victory by a margin of 20 thousand votes.

Rajasthan Legislative Assembly election 2013 
Loss

Rajasthan Legislative Assembly election 2018 
Loss

Parliament election

Notes

External links 

1975 births
Living people
Rajasthan MLAs 2008–2013
People from Jalore district
Rajasthani politicians
Indian National Congress politicians
Use Indian English from October 2016
All Wikipedia articles written in Indian English
Use dmy dates from October 2016